Huangyuan County is a county of Qinghai Province, China, it is under the administration of the prefecture-level city of Xining, the capital of Qinghai. It is under the administration of Xining city.  The county seat is Chengguan Town, known in Mongolian as Dan Gar and in Tibetan as Tongkor.

The remains of Ladrolne Gompa and Rali Hermitage may be seen between Haiyan and Tongkor. A branch of Tongkor Monastery, known as Ganden Tengyeling (Ch. Cinghosi), just to the northwest of the Chengguan is also in ruins.

Climate

Tourist sites 
Dan Gar Ancient Town, the historic core of Chengguan Town, a historic trading town.
Riyue Mountain and the remains of Tongkor Monastery, a mountain pass where Princess Wencheng supposedly traveled through in the 7th century CE.

See also
 List of administrative divisions of Qinghai

References
Dorje, Gyurme. (1999). Footprint Tibet Handbook with Bhutan. (2nd Ed.) Footprint Handbooks, Bath, England. .

Footnotes

County-level divisions of Qinghai
Xining